The Sick, the Dying... and the Dead! is the sixteenth studio album by American thrash metal band Megadeth, released on September 2, 2022, on frontman Dave Mustaine's Tradecraft label via Universal. It is the first Megadeth album to feature drummer Dirk Verbeuren, the second Megadeth album to feature guitarist Kiko Loureiro, and their first studio album in six years since Dystopia (2016), marking the longest gap between two studio albums in the band's career. In production for more than two years, the album was produced by Mustaine and Chris Rakestraw. During the album's recording, classic bassist David Ellefson was dismissed from the band due to sexual misconduct allegations. His bass parts were removed from the album and were re-recorded by Testament bassist Steve Di Giorgio.

Background and production 
The Sick, the Dying... and the Dead! took more than two years to materialize, with the recording sessions taking place between May 2019 and towards the end of 2021, the longest time Megadeth has taken to record an album up to this point. The album's release had been delayed several times. It was originally intended to be released in 2019, before its ultimate release in September 2022.

On May 10, 2019, Megadeth entered the studio in Franklin, Tennessee with co-producer Chris Rakestraw to begin pre-production of the album. In June, the band announced the cancellation of then-upcoming shows, as Mustaine had been diagnosed with throat cancer; Despite Mustaine's illness, the band vowed to continue working on the album. On November 6, 2018 Mustaine shared a video on Twitter teasing a track from the album, which at the time, was originally set for release in the next year.

The band re-entered the studio in Nashville in mid-2020 to resume recording their new album, by now tentatively planned for release in 2021. While hosting a Masterclass "Front Row Live" for fans via Zoom on January 9, 2021, Mustaine announced the album's title as The Sick, the Dying... and the Dead!, but indicated that the title might be subject to change.

An early 2022 release was scrubbed due to issues with vinyl printing and distribution. The album was later delayed further to a September 2022 release.

Dismissal of Ellefson
On May 10, 2021, sexually explicit videos of David Ellefson were posted on Twitter. The videos were reportedly recorded by a fan with whom Ellefson was in correspondence. Initially accusations of child grooming were raised against Ellefson, although both parties denied this. The fan publicly claimed she was a consenting adult. Ellefson subsequently contacted the authorities to seek charges for revenge porn and presented the police with evidence related to the allegations. An official statement released the next day from Megadeth stated that the situation was being "watched closely". Following the incident, Mustaine announced Ellefson's departure from the band on May 24, 2021. His already-recorded bass parts were subsequently removed from the album and rerecorded by Steve Di Giorgio of Testament.

Songs 
"Night Stalkers" features rapper Ice-T on vocals, and "is about the 160th Battalion with the U.S. Army, and it's all the black-ops helicopters that go in at night." "Killing Time" focuses on a former girlfriend of Mustaine's. The first clip released from the album (which was released on Cameo) was titled "Life in Hell".

According to Mustaine, "Dogs of Chernobyl" is not about the war in Ukraine, but "is a love song". Prior to the album's production, Mustaine had been diagnosed with throat cancer. He revealed that his treating radiologist contributed "a couple of phrases and some information about the radiation poisoning when everyone got sick at Chernobyl" to the song's lyrics.

Two cover songs are featured on various editions of the album. Sammy Hagar features on a cover of his solo song, "This Planet's on Fire". "Police Truck" is a heavier cover of the Dead Kennedys song.

Release 
The website sickdyingdead.com was launched on June 20, 2022 to promote the album.

As of December 2022, six singles have been released from the album. The first, "We'll Be Back" was released via streaming services on June 23, with "Night Stalkers" following on July 22.

The third single to be released was "Soldier On!" on August 12. The title track was released as a single on September 2, the same day as the album.

Critical reception 

The Sick, the Dying... and the Dead! has received favorable reviews and holds a Metacritic rating of 78/100. Dom Lawson of Blabbermouth.net rated the album 9 out of 10 and wrote, "That means that Dave Mustaine is well aware of how lethal Megadeth are, circa 2022. This is easily the band's best album since Endgame... possibly even Countdown To Extinction. The cantankerous old devil is back in blistering top form and making music that will remind you exactly why we love the cantankerous old devil in the first place."

Track listing

Personnel 
Megadeth
 Dave Mustaine – guitars, lead vocals, additional bass
 Kiko Loureiro – guitars, backing vocals, flute on "Night Stalkers"
 Dirk Verbeuren – drums

Additional musicians
 Steve Di Giorgio – bass
 Ice-T – guest vocals on "Night Stalkers"
 Sammy Hagar – guest vocals on "This Planet's on Fire"
 Brandon Ray – additional vocals on tracks 1, 2, 5, 6, 8–12
 Eric Idle – voices and bell on track 1
 Eric Darken – percussion on tracks 1–3, 5–12
 Roger Lima – keyboards on tracks 1–9, 11, effects on tracks 1–3, 5–9, 11
 Luliia Tikhomirova – voices on "Dogs of Chernobyl"
 Bill Elliot – voices on "Junkie"
 John Clement – voices on tracks 9, 11
 The Marching Metal Bastards – voices on "Soldier On!"
 Maila Kaarina Rantanen – voices on "Mission to Mars"

Technical personnel
 Dave Mustaine – co-production, engineering, art concept
 Chris Rakestraw – co-production, engineering
 Lowell Reynolds – assistant engineering
 Maddie Harmon – assistant engineering
 Rick West – drum technician 
 Josh Wilbur – mixing
 Ted Jensen – mastering
 Brent Elliott White – cover art
 Josh Graham – artwork, design, layout
 Mcabe Gregg – photography

Charts

Notes

References 

Megadeth albums
2022 albums
Universal Music Group albums